The Roman Catholic Diocese of Jales is a diocese located in the city of Jales in the Ecclesiastical province of Ribeirão Preto in Brazil.

History
 12 December 1959: Established as Diocese of Jales from the Diocese of Rio Preto.

Leadership
 Bishops of Jales (Roman rite), in reverse chronological order
 Bishop José Reginaldo Andrietta (2015.10.21 - present)
 Bishop Luiz Demétrio Valentini (1982.06.08 – 2015.10.21)
 Bishop Luíz Eugênio Pérez (1970.03.09 – 1981.06.07)
 Bishop Arturo Gerrit João Hermanus Maria Horsthuis, A.A. (1960.02.13 – 1968.11.07)

References

Citations

General references
 GCatholic.org
 Catholic Hierarchy
 Diocese website (Portuguese)

Roman Catholic dioceses in Brazil
Christian organizations established in 1959
Jales, Roman Catholic Diocese of
Roman Catholic dioceses and prelatures established in the 20th century